Computed tomography of the chest is a group of CT scan protocols to evaluate the different aspects of lung disorders. It included non-contrasted CT scan of the lungs such as High-resolution computed tomography to look for disorders of lung parenchyma (alveoli), contrasted scan of the lungs (to look for lung cancer and abscesses), and CT pulmonary angiogram (to look for lung perfusion and pulmonary embolism).

References

X-ray computed tomography
Respiratory system imaging